Regalia are the privileges and the insignia characteristic of a sovereign. 

Regalia may also refer to:

Rulers' regalia
 Imperial Regalia of Brazil
 Regalia of the Bulgarian monarch
 Danish Crown Regalia
 English regalia
 French regalia
 Greek Regalia
 Imperial Regalia of the Holy Roman Empire
 Imperial Regalia of Japan
 Regalia of Malaysia
 Regalia of the Netherlands
 Royal regalia in Nigeria
 Regalia of Norway
 Papal regalia and insignia
 Polish Royal Regalia
 Regalia of Romania
 Regalia of the Russian tsars
 Scottish regalia
 Regalia of Serbia
 Regalia of Spain
 Regalia of Sweden
 Regalia of Thailand

Other regalia
 Academic regalia
 Academic regalia of the United States
 Academic regalia of Harvard University
 Academic regalia of Stanford University
 Ku Klux Klan regalia and insignia
 Masonic regalia

Other uses
Jura regalia, royal rights
 Regalia (album), a live album by Cecil Taylor and Paul Lovens
 Regalia: The Three Sacred Stars, a Japanese anime series
 Facu Regalia (born 1991), Argentine racing driver
 Regalia was a ferry on Sydney Harbour, formerly known as Rodney

See also
 Antonio José Álvarez de Abreu, 1st Marquis of la Regalía (1688-1756)
 In Full Regalia, an album by Swedish band The Ark
 Inter regalia (Scots law), a concept that something inherently belongs to the sovereign
 Pavilion of Regalia, Royal Decorations and Coins, Thailand
 "Peaches en Regalia", an instrumental jazz fusion composition by Frank Zappa
 Regalía de aposento, a fee or royalty on housing that was instituted by the Crown of Castile in the Middle Ages
 Royal Regalia Museum, Brunei